HD 40657 is a single star in the equatorial constellation of Orion, near the constellation border with Monoceros. It has an orange hue and is faintly visible to the naked eye with an apparent visual magnitude of 4.52. The star is located at a distance of approximately 289 light years from the Sun based on parallax. It is drifting further away with a radial velocity of +26 km/s.

This is an aging giant star with a stellar classification of K1.5III-IIIb CN-1, where the suffix notation indicates an underabundance of cyanogen in the spectrum. Having exhausted the supply of hydrogen at its core, this star cooled and expanded off the main sequence. At present it has 25 times the radius of the Sun.

HD 40657 is a suspected variable star with a brightness that has been measured ranging from magnitude 4.54 down to 4.58. It is an estimated 2.27 billion years old with 1.68 times the mass of the Sun and is spinning with a projected rotational velocity of 2.1 km/s. The star is radiating 196 times the Sun's luminosity from its swollen photosphere at an effective temperature of 4,317 K.

References

K-type giants
Suspected variables
Orion (constellation)
BD-03 1256
040657
028413
2113